Indorouchera is a monotypic genus of flowering plants belonging to the family Linaceae. It only contains one species, Indorouchera contestiana (Pierre) Hallier f. 

Its native range is Cambodia to Vietnam and Borneo.

Description
The stipules are liguliform (strap-shaped) to shallowly triangular in shape. The flowers are in 4-7 flowered fascicles (small or slender bundles). The sepals are elliptic to ovate in shape. The stamens are 1.8-2.2 mm long and 2.5-3.5 mm wide. The ovary is 3-loculed (has 3 chambers), rather smooth, cylindric to ovoid in shape and 0.8-1 mm long and 0.6-0.7 mm wide. It has 1 or 2 seeds which are ventrally attached (fixed to the belly or underneath). They are often asymmetric, semi-ovoid in shape and 2.5—2.1 mm long and 1.7-1.9 wide.

Taxonomy
The genus name of Indorouchera is in honour of Jean-Antoine Roucher (1745–1794), a French poet, the reason for the Latin specific epithet of contestiana has not been published.
Both genus and species were published in Beih. Bot. Centralbl. Vol.39 (Issue 2) on pages 49-50 in 1921.

Uses
The plant contains saponin-like constituents which are toxic. They are used to create poisons to place on arrow tips.
The wood (of the stems) is tough, but not excessively hard, and will not split easily.

References

Linaceae
Malpighiales genera
Plants described in 1921
Flora of Cambodia
Flora of Vietnam
Flora of Borneo